Messalina is a 1924 Italian historical drama film directed by Enrico Guazzoni and starring Rina De Liguoro, Calisto Bertramo, and Gildo Bocci. It portrays the life of Messalina, the third wife of the Roman Emperor Claudius.

Cast
 Rina De Liguoro as Messalina
 Calisto Bertramo 
 Gildo Bocci as Apollonio 
 Bruto Castellani as Tigrane  
 Mario Cusmich 
 Édouard de Max 
 Alfredo de Felice
 Aristide Garbini as Narciso 
 Rita Jolivet 
 Augusto Mastripietri as Claudio  
 Gino Talamo as Ennio 
 Gianna Terribili-Gonzales as Mirit 
 Adolfo Trouché 
 Lucia Zanussi as Egle

References

Bibliography 
 Moliterno, Gino. Historical Dictionary of Italian Cinema. Scarecrow Press, 2008.

External links 
 

1924 films
Italian historical drama films
Italian epic films
Italian silent feature films
1920s Italian-language films
Films directed by Enrico Guazzoni
1920s historical drama films
Films set in ancient Rome
Films set in the Roman Empire
Films set in the 1st century
Italian films based on plays
Cultural depictions of Messalina
Italian black-and-white films
1924 drama films
Silent historical drama films
Silent adventure films
1920s Italian films